Marque Richardson Jr. (born October 23, 1985) is an American actor.

Early life 
Richardson was born in San Diego, California in the U.S., in a naval hospital.  Both parents served in the United States Navy. His father hails from Detroit, Michigan in the U.S., and his mother from Newport News, Virginia in the U.S. The elder of two siblings, he began his acting career starring in commercials at the age of four. Having moved around frequently, he was primarily raised in Bellflower, California in the U.S.

Balancing school life with entertainment, Richardson was a scholar-athlete at Mayfair High School in Lakewood, California. In 2007, he graduated from the University of Southern California with degrees in business, Public Policy, Planning & Management on full scholarship from the Bill & Melinda Gates Foundation.

After graduation Richardson interned at Overbrook Entertainment to gain insight of life behind the camera.

Career 
One of Richardson's first television roles was a guest appearance on The Bernie Mac Show as Tyrone, aka "Lemon-Lyme". He has also appeared in ER, 7th Heaven, Lincoln Heights and Rules of Engagement.  He starred in the web series My Alibi.  He had a recurring role on USA Networks' The Starter Wife.

He won a role in Joseph Kahn's horror/comedy film Detention, released by Sony in 2012. He most notably scored recurring roles as Kenneth on Seasons 5 and 6 of HBO's hit True Blood, and, in 2013, as Mark Gage in the HBO series The Newsroom.

In 2014, Richardson starred in the critically acclaimed film Dear White People, a satire that won the U.S. Dramatic Special Jury Prize "for the arrival of an exciting new voice in American cinema" at Sundance. The film was theatrically released by Lionsgate / Roadside Attractions. He also reprises his starring role in Dear White People, the "Netflix Original" TV show based on the film.

Personal life 
Richardson is a strong advocate of community service and has been involved with various global service projects. In 2005, he traveled to Khao Lak, Thailand to provide relief after the area's devastating tsunami in December, 2004. He also worked with Habitat for Humanity to build homes in Baton Rouge, Louisiana (post Hurricane Katrina) and Retalhuleu, Guatemala. In 2018 he partnered to form The Jordan Edwards Memorial Scholarship Fund, an endowment fund that awards scholarships to honor the legacy of Jordan Edwards, a child who was murdered by a police officer in Dallas, Texas.

Filmography

Film

Television

References

1985 births
Living people
21st-century American male actors
American male film actors
American male television actors
American male screenwriters
University of Southern California alumni
Male actors from San Diego
People from Bellflower, California
People from Lakewood, California
African-American male actors
Screenwriters from California
21st-century African-American people
20th-century African-American people